Honing is a village and a civil parish in the English county of Norfolk. The nearest railway station is at Worstead on the Bittern Line which runs between Cromer and Norwich. The nearest airport is Norwich International Airport. The village and parish of Honing with Crostwight had in the 2001 census, a population of 319, but this fell to 312 at the 2011 Census. For the purposes of local government, the village falls within the district of North Norfolk.

Description
Honing is a large parish in north-east of the county of Norfolk. Its northern boundary is with the civil parish of Witton whilst to the south is the parish of Dilham. West lies Worstead and on the eastern boundary is the parish of East Ruston. The disused North Walsham & Dilham Canal runs along the south-west boundary of the parish. There are several areas of common land within the parish, including Crostwight Common and Honing Common. The Weavers' Way long distance footpath runs across the south east corner of the parish along the old track bed of the Midland and Great Northern Joint Railway that ran between North Walsham and Stalham. The village sign depicts a labourer honing his scythe. Since 1935, the civil parish of Honing has incorporated its very small neighbouring village of Crostwight. The name Honing derives from the Old English for something approaching settlement of the people at the hill or rock.

History
There is very little evidence of any human settlement or activity in the parish of Honing until the medieval period and beyond, apart from a Mesolithic or possibly Neolithic flint axehead.

The Domesday Book
Honing has an entry in the Domesday Book of 1085 where it, its population, land ownership and productive resources were extensively detailed In the survey Honing is recorded by the name of Haninga. The main tenants being the Robert Malet from the abbot of Holme who had held the land before and after 1066, Robert de Glanville from Robert Malet, and Ranulf brother of Ilger. The survey also list that there have always been 13 smallholders on this land. 2 ploughs in lordship; 3 men's ploughs; meadow, ; woodland, 8 pigs; 1 mill: 2 cobs; 4 head of cattle; 12 pigs; 40 sheep; 30 goats. Also 8 freemen, . Always 2 ploughs; meadow, . Value of the whole 40s. It has 1 league in length and 10 furlongs in width; tax of 10d, whoever holds there.

Notable buildings and structures

The parish church of Saint Peter and Saint Paul
The parish church is situated on raised ground north of the village. On its west elevation is a tall perpendicular tower with flushwork panelling at its base and battlements. The tower has a three light window with transom and tracery. Below the window is another window which was once the west door and thought to have been filled in a period of reconstruction c.1795. In the same period of restoration the aisles were reduced to narrow passages and the length of the chancel was shortened to only four feet. The font dates from the 13th century. The stem is perpendicular with the bowl of Purbeck marble. The roof dates from the 18th century. Between the choir stalls is a brass to Nicholas Parker of 1496. He is depicted in full armour. On the north wall hang two hatchments, both to a man leaving a surviving wife. There are also two tablets, one to Thomas Cubitt who died in 1829, and the other to Edward George Cubitt who died in 1865.

Honing Hall

Honing Hall is a Grade II listed country house which was built in 1748 and altered and renovated in 1790 by the prominent architect John Soane. Landscaping and further work on the hall was carried out under the instructions of Humphry Repton in 1792. The house was built originally for a wealthy Worstead weaver called Andrew Chambers on the land once occupied by previous dwellings. The hall and grounds are in private ownership and are currently owned by Cubitt Family whose descendants have lived at the hall since 1784.

Midland and Great Northern Joint Railway

The Midland and Great Northern Joint Railway ran through the parish, part of a line that linked Great Yarmouth to Sutton Bridge via Stalham, North Walsham, Aylsham, Melton Constable, Fakenham and King's Lynn. It opened in stages between 1865 and 1933. The line closed in 1959, although some sections survive and are now part of the Weaver's Way footpath. Other remnants of the line that can still be seen in the parish are a cast iron, steel and brick railway bridge of 1881 on the Dilham road south of the village. At Briggate there are still the disused platforms of Honing Station.

Gallery

References

 
Villages in Norfolk
Civil parishes in Norfolk
North Norfolk